The Heinkel He 60 was a German single-engined biplane reconnaissance seaplane designed to be catapulted from Kriegsmarine (German navy) warships of the 1930s.

Development and design

The Heinkel He 60 was designed by Heinkel engineer Reinhold Mewes, the designer of the He 59. The resulting design was a single-engined biplane of mixed wood and metal construction with fabric covering. Its single bay wings were of equal-span and had significant stagger.

The first prototype flew early in 1933 and proved to be underpowered with its 492 kW (660 hp) BMW VI engine. The second prototype had a more powerful version of the BMW engine, but this only marginally improved its performance and was unreliable, so production aircraft reverted to the original engine. Of conventional configuration, the He 60 was a sturdy aircraft, designed (as the specification required) to be capable of operating on the open sea. As a result, it was always somewhat underpowered for its weight, which made handling sluggish and the aircraft vulnerable to enemy fire. Attempts were made to solve its lack of power by fitting one aircraft with a Daimler-Benz DB 600 engine, but engines were not available for production.

Operational history

Initial deliveries of the He 60 were to Kriegsmarine training units in June 1933. From 1934, the major production version, the He 60C began to be delivered to the shipboard observation seaplane units of the Kriegsmarine, operating from the catapults of all German cruisers. It also saw action with Spanish Nationalist forces during the Civil War.

In 1939 it was replaced as a shipboard aircraft first by the He 114 in service, then soon after by the Arado Ar 196, but it remained in service with several coast reconnaissance Staffeln (squadrons) when World War II began. It had been withdrawn from front-line service by 1940, but returned to use following Germany's invasion of the Soviet Union in 1941, being used for coastal patrol work in the Baltic and Mediterranean Seas. All He 60s were removed from service by October 1943.

Variants
He 60a
First prototype which began flight testing in early 1933.
He 60b
Second prototype which experimented with a more powerful engine. However, it proved no better and the design reverted to that used in the 60a.
He 60c
Third prototype, used for successful catapult trials in early 1933. This aircraft was delivered into operational service with the navy.
He 60A
14 pre-production aircraft were ordered. A total of 81 A-variant aircraft were produced.
He 60B
Initial production version, commencing in 1934.
He 60B-3
In 1933 a single aircraft was fitted with a 671 kW (900 hp) Daimler-Benz DB 600 engine in an effort to improve performance. However, the development was dropped.
He 60C
In late summer 1934, the improved C-variant went into production, with first deliveries in Autumn 1934.
He 60D
The D-variant was similar to the He 60C, with the capability added for a fixed MG-17 machine gun and improved radio equipment. Production commenced in June 1936.
He 60E
6 aircraft were ordered by Spain, and these D-variants were called the 60E, ending delivery in April 1937. They flew coastal patrols in the Spanish Civil War, and the last aircraft were withdrawn from service in 1948.

Operators

Bulgarian Navy - 5 examples from 1942-1944

Luftwaffe
Kriegsmarine

Spanish Air Force

Specifications (He 60)

See also

References

Notes

Bibliography
 Donald, David (editor). Warplanes of the Luftwaffe. London:Aerospace Publishing, 1994. .
 Gerdessen, Frederik. "Estonian Air Power 1918 – 1945". Air Enthusiast, No. 18, April – July 1982. pp. 61–76. .
Green, William. War Planes of the Second World War: Volume Six Floatplanes. London:Macdonald 1962.
Smith, J.R. and Kay, Antony L. German Aircraft of the Second World War. London:Putnam, 1972. .
Lang, Gerhard. The Heinkel HE 60 (Luftwaffe Profile). Schiffer Publishing, 2004. 

Biplanes
1930s German military reconnaissance aircraft
Floatplanes
He 060
Single-engined tractor aircraft
Aircraft first flown in 1933